The Reformist Party (abbr. RS), also known as the Reformists (Реформисти / Reformisti) was a minor Niš-based regionalist political party in Serbia. Party was founded and led by Aleksandar Višnjić, political activist, former member of Otpor! and Democratic Party (DS) and professor at Faculty of Medicine of the University of Niš.

History
The Reformists took part in the 2007 parliamentary election as an independent list and won no seats finishing the last with only 0.05 percent of vote or 1,881 votes. It is one of four parties that won less than 10,000 votes even though they had to submit exactly the same number of signatures in order to be able to run in the elections. It also had a candidate for the 2008 presidential election, its vice-president Jugoslav Dobričanin. The Reformist Party ran again in 2008 and 2012 Serbian parliamentary elections, but was below the threshold both times.

Republican Party
In January 2014, former high-ranked member and MP of the ruling Serbian Progressive Party, Vladimir Cvijan joined the Reformist Party becoming its president, announcing its renaming and rebranding as the new anti-corruption and pro-democracy Republican Party, while the founder and former president Višnjić agreed to be vice-president of the reformed political party. Shortly after that Cvijan disappeared from public life, and the new party was never founded. Višnjić's party continued to operate locally until June 2018, when it merged into the new Conservative Reform Party (KRST).

References

2005 establishments in Serbia
Political parties established in 2005
Centrist parties in Serbia